Edgar Thomas may refer to:

 Edgar Thomas (cricketer) (1875–1936), English cricketer
 Edgar Thomas (footballer) (born 1895), Welsh international footballer

See also
 Thomas (surname)